Kozhin is a Russian masculine surname, its feminine counterpart is Kozhina. It may refer to:

Alexander Kozhin (born 1990), Russian archer
Margarita Kozhina (1925–2012), Russian linguist
Simon Kozhin (born 1979), Russian artist
Vasilisa Kozhina (c.1780–1840), Russian partisan during the 1812 war
Vladimir Kozhin (disambiguation)

Russian-language surnames